Polizzi Generosa (Sicilian: Pulizzi) is a town and comune   in the Metropolitan City of Palermo on the island of Sicily, southern Italy.

History

The site of Polizzi shows signs of human occupation dating to the 6th century BC, with archaeological finds including coins from Himera, Carthaginian remains and a Hellenistic necropolis. In the 4th century it was a Carthaginian fortress occupied by mercenaries from Campania.

The town probably developed as a population centre in the late Middle Ages, growing around the castle built by the Norman Count of Sicily Roger I in 1076.

People
People with connections to Polizzi Generosa include:
Fashion designer Domenico Dolce, one half of the Dolce & Gabbana clothing company, was born in the town.
The writer, journalist and literary critic Giuseppe Antonio Borgese originally came from the town.
Catholic cardinal Mariano Rampolla was born in Polizzi Generosa.
Director Martin Scorsese's paternal grandparents emigrated from Polizzi Generosa. 
Filmmaker and musician Antonia Scarpa's family also came from the town.
Character actor Vincent Schiavelli moved to the town, where his grandfather lived, for the final years of his life. Schiavelli was also a food and cookbook writer who wrote about Polizzi Generosa and his roots in Many Beautiful Things: Stories and Recipes from Polizzi Generosa. He was also buried there when he died.
Valentina Tereshkova, the first woman to fly in space, was awarded honorary citizenship of Polizzi Generosa.

References

Sources

External links
 Extracted Civil Records

Municipalities of the Metropolitan City of Palermo